Below is a List of National Association of Basketball Coaches presidents

Presidents

References

Coaches
 
Nat